"Hit in the USA" is a single released by Japanese band Beat Crusaders, and the song was used as the opening for the anime series Beck: Mongolian Chop Squad, and was later added to the P.O.A.: Pop on Arrival full-length album in 2005. "Hit in the USA" was released October 20, 2004. They also released a maxi single, containing three songs featured on the anime series.

Tracks 
Single
 "Hit in the USA" – 2:59
 "Supercollider" – 3:01
 "B.A.D." – 3:43

References 

2004 singles
2004 songs
Defstar Records singles
Anime songs